The Anglican Diocese of Johannesburg is part of the Anglican Church of Southern Africa. It was formed in 1922 from the southern part of the Diocese of Pretoria, and at that time included the whole of the southern Transvaal. Today it is much smaller, and comprises the central part of Gauteng province. The Cathedral of the Diocese of Johannesburg, is the Cathedral Church of Saint Mar the Virgin. The headquarters of the Diocese and the Bishops office are Situated at St.Joseph's Diocesan Centre in Sophiatown, Johannesburg. The following are diocesan schools St. John's College, Johannesburg, St Mary's School, Waverley, Bishop Bavin School, St Peter's College, Johannesburg and  Vuleka School. The diocese has a total of 76 Parishes

List of the Bishops of Johannesburg 

 Arthur Karney 1922-1933
 Geoffrey Clayton 1934-1949
 Ambrose Reeves 1949-1961
 Edward Paget (former archbishop of Central Africa) served as vicar-general following Reeves' deportation in September 1960
 Leslie Stradling 1961-1974
 Timothy Bavin 1974-1985
 Desmond Tutu 1985-1986
 George Buchanan 1986-2000
 Sigisbert Ndwandwe was a suffragan bishop of the diocese in 1988
 Godfrey Ashby, Assistant Bishop of Leicester (England) was also an assistant bishop of the diocese in 1988
 Brian Germond 2000-2013
 Stephen Moreo elected on 4 Sept 2012, consecrated 16 March 2013

Coat of arms 

The diocese assumed a coat of arms in 1922.  The arms were formally granted by the College of Arms in 1949, and registered at the Bureau of Heraldry in 1964 : Gules,  in  front of two wings conjoined in lure Or,  a  heart  Gules  transfixed  by  a  sword,   point downwards  proper,  pommel  and  hilt Or, a chief barry wavy of six Azure and Argent, the shield ensigned  with an episcopal mitre.

References

Sources

External links 
 
 Vuleka School

1922 establishments in South Africa
Anglican Church of Southern Africa dioceses
Christianity in Johannesburg